John Harvatine IV is an American producer and director best known for his work on the television show Robot Chicken.

In 2010, Harvatine, Eric Towner, Matt Senreich, and Seth Green launched Stoopid Buddy Stoodios, as part of Stoopid Monkey LLC. Harvatine is represented by The Gotham Group.

In 2016, as of the executive producers for Robot Chicken, Harvatine received an Emmy Award in the category "Outstanding Short-Format Animated Program" for his work on the "Born Again Virgin Christmas Special" episode of Robot Chicken, as well as in 2018 for Robot Chicken in the same category.

Harvatine and Towner are directing Superbago, a mixed stop-motion and live-action film developed with Sony Pictures Animation. Development began in 2014. Stoopid Buddy is also developing Extraordinary Believers as an Xbox Original and WWE Slam City, which was formerly a web series, for Nickelodeon. He has also guest directed for The Simpsons on two Robot Chicken couch gags. Currently, Harvatine is creating a stop-motion animated comedy, Crossing Swords, for Hulu released on June 12, 2020.

References

External links
 
 

American animators
Living people
Stop motion animators
American film directors
Place of birth missing (living people)
American animated film directors
American animated film producers
Primetime Emmy Award winners
Year of birth missing (living people)
Apple Valley High School (Minnesota) alumni